George Melville Bolling (April 13, 1871 – June 1, 1963) was an American linguist. 

Bolling was born in Baltimore, Maryland. He attended Loyola College. In 1895 he became professor of Greek, and associate professor of comparative philology and Sanskrit at Catholic University. In 1897 he received his doctorate from Johns Hopkins University. 

He taught at  Ohio State University as professor of Greek Languages and Literature. He was one of the signers of the call that led to the foundation of the Linguistic Society of America, and served as its president in 1931. From 1925–1931 he was the editor of the Society's academic journal, Language.He was a member of the American Philological Association, American Oriental Society, and the Archaeological Institute of America. 

He was a contributor to the American Journal of Philology, the American Oriental Society Journal, the Trans-American Philological Association Bulletin, the Catholic University Bulletin, and the Catholic Encyclopedia.

Publications 

 Bolling, George Melville. The External Evidence for Interpolation in Homer. Oxford: Clarendon Press, 1998.

References

 

1871 births
1963 deaths
Linguists from the United States
Ohio State University faculty
Johns Hopkins University alumni
People from Baltimore
Contributors to the Catholic Encyclopedia
Loyola University Maryland alumni
Linguistic Society of America presidents